Melchor José Ramos (January 3, 1805 - April 19, 1832 in Santiago) was a Chilean political figure and journalist.  He founded the El Cometa political newspaper in 1827. He died on April 19, 1832 aged just 27.

References

Chilean journalists
1805 births
1832 deaths
People from Santiago
19th-century journalists
Male journalists
19th-century male writers